The Mongol conquests of the 13th century resulted in widespread and well-documented destruction. The Mongol army conquered hundreds of cities and villages and killed millions of people. One estimate is that about 11% of the world's population was killed either during or immediately after the Mongol invasions, around 37.75–60 million people in Eurasia. These events are regarded as some of the most deadly acts of mass killing in human history.

Strategy

To avoid war, Genghis Khan and his generals preferred to offer their enemies a chance to surrender without resistance. These enemies would then become vassals by sending tribute, accepting Mongol residents, and/or contributing troops. In return, the Khan would guarantee their protection, but only if those who submitted to Mongol rule were obedient.

If the enemy offered any resistance, what followed was massive destruction, terror and death. David Nicole notes in The Mongol Warlords that "terror and mass extermination of anyone opposing them was a well-tested Mongol tactic". If an enemy refused to submit, the Mongols would employ a strategy of total war; with Mongol leaders ordering the collective slaughter of populations and the destruction of property. Such was the fate of resisting Muslim communities during the invasions of the Khwarezmid Empire.

The success of Mongol tactics hinged on fear to induce capitulation of enemy populations. From the perspective of modern theories of international relations, Quester suggested, "Perhaps terrorism produced a fear that immobilised and incapacitated the forces that would have resisted."

As Mongol conquests spread, that form of psychological warfare proved effective at suppressing resistance to Mongol rule. There were tales of lone Mongol soldiers riding into surrendered villages and executing peasants at random as a test of loyalty. It was widely known that a single act of resistance would bring the entire Mongol army onto a town to obliterate its occupants. Thus, they ensured obedience through fear. Peasants frequently appear to have joined Mongol troops or to have readily accepted their demands.

Demographic changes in war torn areas

Ancient sources described Genghis Khan's conquests as wholesale destruction on an unprecedented scale in certain geographical regions, causing great demographic changes in Asia. According to the works of the Iranian historian Rashid al-Din (1247–1318), the Mongols killed more than 1,300,000 people in Merv and more than 1,747,000 in Nishapur. The total population of Persia may have dropped from 2,500,000 to 250,000 as a result of mass extermination and famine. Population exchanges also sometimes occurred.

According to Diana Lary, the Mongol invasions induced population displacement "on a scale never seen before" in Eurasia, but especially in China, where the massive southward migration of Northern Chinese refugees actually managed to merge the southern and northern parts of China, an unexpected historical consequence. China suffered a drastic decline in population in the 13th and the 14th centuries. Before the Mongol invasion, Chinese dynasties reportedly had approximately 120 million inhabitants; after the conquest had been completed in 1279, the 1300 census reported roughly 60 million people. While it is tempting to attribute the major decline solely to Mongol ferocity, scholars now have mixed sentiments on the subject. The South Chinese might account for 40 million unregistered persons who, without passports, would not have appeared in the census.  Entire peasant populations joining or enlisted for labor could result in a large population reduction because of food shortages.  Scholars such as Frederick W. Mote argue that the wide drop in numbers reflects an administrative failure of records, rather than a de facto decrease, but others, such as Timothy Brook, argue that the Mongols created a system of enserfment of a huge portion of the Chinese populace, causing many to disappear from the census altogether. Other historians, like William McNeill and David Morgan, argue that the Black Death, spread by the Mongols, was the main factor behind the demographic decline in that period. The plague also spread into areas of Western Europe and Africa that the Mongols never reached. The Mongols practiced biological warfare by catapulting diseased cadavers into the cities they besieged. It is believed that fleas remaining on the bodies of the cadavers may have acted as vectors to spread the Black Death.

Colin McEvedy (Atlas of World Population History, 1978) estimates the population of European Russia dropped from 7.5 million prior to the invasion to 7 million after it. Historians estimate that up to half of Hungary's population of two million were victims of the Mongol invasion of Europe.

Destruction of culture and property 
Mongol campaigns in Northern China, Central Asia, Eastern Europe and the Middle East caused extensive destruction, but there are no exact figures available for that time. The cities of Balkh, Bamiyan, Herat, Kyiv, Baghdad, Nishapur, Merv, Konye-Urgench, Lahore, Ryazan, Chernigov, Vladimir and Samarkand suffered serious devastation by the Mongol armies. For example, there is a noticeable lack of Chinese literature from the Jin dynasty, predating the Mongol conquest, and in the Siege of Baghdad (1258), libraries, books, literature, and hospitals were burned: some of the books were thrown into the river in quantities sufficient to turn the Tigris black with ink for several months, according to legend; further, "in one week, libraries and their treasures that had been accumulated over hundreds of years were burned or otherwise destroyed. So many books were thrown into the Tigris River, according to one writer, that they formed a bridge that would support a man on horseback."

Genghis Khan was largely tolerant of multiple religions, but there are many cases of him and other Mongols engaging in religious war even if the populations were obedient. He passed a decree charging all Taoist followers to pay more taxes. All campaigns involved deliberately destroying places of worship. 

The Mongols' destruction of the irrigation systems of Iran and Iraq turned back millennia of effort in building irrigation and drainage infrastructure in these regions. The loss of available food as a result may have led to the death of more people from starvation in this area than the actual battle did. The Islamic civilization of the Persian Gulf region did not recover until after the Middle Ages.

Foods and disease
Mongols were known to burn farmland. When they were trying to take the Ganghwa Island palaces during the at least six separate invasions of Korea under the Goryeo Dynasty, crops were burned to starve the populace. Other tactics included diverting rivers into and from cities and towns and catapulting diseased corpses over city walls to infect the population. The use of such infected bodies during the siege of Caffa is alleged by some sources to have brought the Black Death to Europe.

Tribute in lieu of conquest
Those who agreed to pay the Mongols tribute were spared invasion and left relatively independent. While populations resisting were usually annihilated and so did not pay a regular tribute, exceptions to the rule included the Goryeo dynasty of Korea, which finally agreed to pay regular tributes in exchange for vassaldom and some measure of autonomy as well as the retention of the ruling dynasty, further emphasizing the Mongol preference for tribute and vassals, which would serve as a somewhat regular and continuous source of income, as opposed to outright conquest and destruction.

Different tributes were taken from different cultures. For instance, Goryeo was assessed at 10,000 otter skins, 20,000 horses, 10,000 bolts of silk, clothing for soldiers, and a large number of children and artisans as slaves.

Environmental impact
According to a study by the Carnegie Institution for Science's Department of Global Energy, the annihilation of so many human beings and cities under Genghis Khan may have scrubbed as much as 700 million tonnes of carbon from the atmosphere by allowing forests to regrow on previously populated and cultivated land.

See also
 Genocides in history
 List of genocides by death toll

References

Further reading 
 May, Timothy. The Mongol Conquests in World History (London: Reaktion Books, 2011) online review; excerpt and text search
 Morgan, David. The Mongols (2nd ed. 2007)
 Nicolle, David. The Mongol Warlords: Genghis Khan, Kublai Khan, Hulegu, Tamerlane (2004)
 Saunders, J. J. The History of the Mongol Conquests (2001) excerpt and text search
  Turnbull, Stephen. Genghis Khan and the Mongol Conquests 1190–1400 (2003) excerpt and text search

 Primary sources
 Rossabi, Morris. The Mongols and Global History: A Norton Documents Reader (2011),

History of the Mongol Empire
War crimes
Genocides in Asia